Michael Meredith may refer to:

 Michael Meredith (film director) (born 1967), American film director, screenwriter and producer
 Michael Meredith (architect) (born 1971), American architect
 Michael Meredith (politician) (born 1985), American politician and member of the Kentucky House of Representatives